Melvindale is a city in Wayne County of the U.S. state of Michigan. At the 2020 census, the city population was 12,851.

History
Melvindale began as the unincorporated settlement of Oakwood Heights in the northwestern part of Ecorse Township in the early 1920s.  The subdivision was designed to house workers from the nearby Ford River Rouge Plant in the city of Dearborn.  The city was named after one of the original developers of the settlement, Melvin Wilkinson.  The eastern part of Oakwood Heights was annexed by the city of Detroit in 1922, and the remainder was incorporated as the village of Melvindale the same year.  In 1933, the village incorporated as a city.

Geography

Melvindale serves an important role for railroad traffic in Metro Detroit. The Norfolk Southern Railway Oakwood Yard, located along its Detroit District, divides the city into northwest and southeast sides. The Canadian National Railway Dearborn Subdivision serves as the city's western boundary, and the Conrail Shared Assets Lincoln Secondary, serving as a direct route between Detroit and Toledo, Ohio for CSX Transportation trains, passes through industrial areas in the far southeast corner of the city, which is also the location of the remnants of the Conrail Lincoln Yard.

Demographics

2020 census
As of the census of 2020, there were 12,851 people living in Melvindale, this was an increase from the city's population of 10,715 in the 2010 census, and the first time since the 1970 census that the city's recorded population increased.

2010 census
As of the census of 2010, there were 10,715 people, 4,420 households, and 2,601 families living in the city. The racial makeup of the city was 76.8% White (66.6% non-Hispanic white), 11.3% African American, 0.7% Native American, 0.8% Asian, 6.4% from other races, and 3.9% from two or more races. Hispanic or Latino of any race were 18.3% of the population.

There were 4,420 households, of which 31.2% had children under the age of 18 living with them, 34.4% were married couples living together, 17.9% had a female householder with no husband present, and 6.5% had a male householder with no wife present. 35.5% of all households were made up of individuals, and 11% had someone living alone who was 65 years of age or older. The average household size was 2.42 and the average family size was 3.17.

The median age in the city was 36.5 years. 24.7% of residents were under the age of 18; 9.8% were between the ages of 18 and 24; 27.2% were from 25 to 44; 26.6% were from 45 to 64; and 11.8% were 65 years of age or older. The gender makeup of the city was 48.1% male and 51.9% female.

2000 census
As of the census of 2000, there were 10,735 people, 4,499 households, and 2,694 families living in the city. The racial makeup of the city was 87.40% White, 5.26% African American, 0.75% Native American, 1.29% Asian, 0.04% Pacific Islander, 2.39% from other races, and 2.88% from two or more races. Hispanic or Latino of any race were 8.90% of the population.

There were 4,499 households, out of which 28.6% had children under the age of 18 living with them, 39.6% were married couples living together, 14.8% had a female householder with no husband present, and 40.1% were non-families. 34.5% of all households were made up of individuals, and 12.7% had someone living alone who was 65 years of age or older. The average household size was 2.38 and the average family size was 3.07.

In the city, the population was spread out, with 24.4% under the age of 18, 9.0% from 18 to 24, 31.6% from 25 to 44, 21.5% from 45 to 64, and 13.5% who were 65 years of age or older. The median age was 36 years. For every 100 females, there were 96.1 males. For every 100 females age 18 and over, there were 94.5 males.

The median income for a household in the city was $37,954, and the median income for a family was $46,759. Males had a median income of $38,048 versus $28,026 for females. The per capita income for the city was $19,011.  About 7.6% of families and 11.4% of the population were below the poverty line, including 13.3% of those under age 18 and 9.2% of those age 65 or over.

Education
Melvindale-Northern Allen Park Public Schools serves Melvindale. Melvindale High School is the district's high school.

In 2005 the Roman Catholic Archdiocese of Detroit announced that St. Mary Magdalen Elementary School in Melvindale would close.

Notable people
Al Cicotte, baseball player 
Mickey Goodwin, light-heavyweight boxer
Raymond Kalisz, Roman Catholic bishop
Mike Jolly, played football at the University of Michigan and for the Green Bay Packers
Jessica Smith, 2014 Olympic speed skater

Gallery

References

External links

City of Melvindale official website

Cities in Wayne County, Michigan
Metro Detroit
Sundown towns in Michigan